Graphosia pachygramma is a moth of the family Erebidae. It was described by George Hampson in 1914. It is found on New Guinea.

References

External links
 

Lithosiina
Moths described in 1914